Thomas Herald Rea (1929 – February 7, 2016) was an American dermatologist known for his research into treatments for leprosy.

Early life
Rea was born in 1929 in Three Rivers, Michigan. He graduated from Oberlin College in Ohio and the University of Michigan in Ann Arbor's medical school, where he also completed his dermatology residency.

Career
Rea worked for the U.S. Army Medical Corps in Korea and in the dermatology department at New York University before moving to Los Angeles in 1970. From 1981 to 1996, he was the head of the dermatology division at University of Southern California.

Work
Rea and his colleague Robert Modlin researched the role the immune system played in symptoms of leprosy, which led to the development of new treatments for the disease that rendered it non-contagious and allowed leprosy patients to live normal lives. Rea also supported the use of thalidomide to treat a complication of leprosy.

Death
Rea died on February 7, 2016, at his home in the San Gabriel Mountains, after a battle with cancer.

References

1929 births
2016 deaths
American dermatologists
People from Three Rivers, Michigan
Oberlin College alumni
University of Michigan Medical School alumni
University of Southern California faculty
Deaths from cancer in California